Carpinteria (meaning "Carpentry") is a small seaside city in southeastern Santa Barbara County, California. Located on the Central Coast of California, it had a population of 13,264 at the 2020 census. Carpinteria is a popular surf destination; the city embraced the slogan "World's Safest Beach" in 1912, which it still uses today.

History
 
Carpinteria was home to a Chumash village during pre-colonial times, which was known as Šujtu.

In 1769, the Spanish Portolá expedition came west along the beach from the previous night's encampment at Rincon. The explorers found a large native village on the point of land where Carpinteria Pier is today. The party camped nearby on August 17. Fray Juan Crespí, a Franciscan missionary travelling with the expedition, noted that "Not far from the town we saw some springs of pitch. The Indians have many canoes, and at the time were building one, for which reason the soldiers named this town La Carpinteria" (the carpentry shop).

The Chumash people used the naturally occurring surface asphalt to seal their canoes, known as Tomols. Petroleum seeps are still visible along the beach bluffs at Tar Pits Park on the campground beach of Carpinteria State Beach. The three closest drilling platforms visible from the shore are within the Carpinteria Offshore Oil Field, the 50th-largest field in California.

Geography

The city is located almost entirely on a coastal plain in between the Santa Ynez Mountains and the Pacific Ocean. Immediately to the north of Carpinteria lie foothills and then the Santa Ynez Mountains. Between the foothills and the populated area of the city is an agricultural zone. The mountains provide a scenic backdrop to town, covered in chaparral and displaying prominent sandstone outcrops. Because of the well-ventilated nature of the air basin, ozone concentrations are low while air quality is high.

Seals and sea lions can be seen in the area December through May at the rookery in the nearby Carpinteria Bluffs, as well as an occasional gray whale. Tidepools contain starfish, sea anemones, crabs, snails, octopuses and sea urchins.

There is bird watching at Carpinteria Salt Marsh Reserve, established in 1977 and administered by the Natural Reserve System of the University of California.

The Wardholme Torrey Pine, the largest known Torrey pine tree on earth, is located in downtown Carpinteria.

Climate
This region experiences warm (but not hot) and dry summers, with no average monthly temperatures above 71.6 °F.  According to the Köppen Climate Classification system, Carpinteria has a warm-summer Mediterranean climate, abbreviated "Csb" on climate maps.

Demographics

2010

At the 2010 census Carpinteria had a population of 13,040. The racial makeup of Carpinteria was 9,348 (71.7%) White, Hispanic or Latino of any race were 6,351 persons (48.7%), 109 (0.8%) African American, 144 (1.1%) Native American, 296 (2.3%) Asian, 15 (0.1%) Pacific Islander, 2,599 (19.9%) from other races, and 529 (4.1%) from two or more races.

The census reported that 13,021 people (99.9% of the population) lived in households, 19 (0.1%) lived in non-institutionalized group quarters, and no one was institutionalized.

There were 4,759 households, 1,510 (31.7%) had children under the age of 18 living in them, 2,305 (48.4%) were married couples living together, 597 (12.5%) had a female householder with no husband present, 239 (5.0%) had a male householder with no wife present.  There were 293 (6.2%) unmarried opposite-sex partnerships, and 28 (0.6%) same-sex married couples or partnerships. 1,203 households (25.3%) were one person and 525 (11.0%) had someone living alone who was 65 or older. The average household size was 2.74.  There were 3,141 families (66.0% of households); the average family size was 3.23.

The age distribution was 2,791 people (21.4%) under the age of 18, 1,267 people (9.7%) aged 18 to 24, 3,466 people (26.6%) aged 25 to 44, 3,717 people (28.5%) aged 45 to 64, and 1,799 people (13.8%) who were 65 or older.  The median age was 39.5 years. For every 100 females, there were 97.2 males.  For every 100 females age 18 and over, there were 95.3 males.

There were 5,429 housing units at an average density of 585.6 per square mile, of the occupied units 2,347 (49.3%) were owner-occupied and 2,412 (50.7%) were rented. The homeowner vacancy rate was 1.8%; the rental vacancy rate was 6.5%.  6,130 people (47.0% of the population) lived in owner-occupied housing units and 6,891 people (52.8%) lived in rental housing units.

2000
At the 2000 census there were 14,194 persons, 4,989 households, and 3,332 families in the city. The racial makeup of the city was 73.40% White, 0.59% African American, 0.99% Native American, 2.38% Asian, 0.18% Pacific Islander, 18.09% from other races, and 4.37% from two or more races. Hispanic or Latino of any race were 43.50%.

Of the 4,989 households 33.3% had children under the age of 18 living with them, 51.6% were married couples living together, 10.5% had a female householder with no husband present, and 33.2% were non-families. 25.5% of households were one person and 10.5% were one person aged 65 or older. The average household size was 2.82 and the average family size was 3.38.

The age distribution was 25.6% under the age of 18, 9.2% from 18 to 24, 30.7% from 25 to 44, 22.1% from 45 to 64, and 12.4% 65 or older. The median age was 36 years. For every 100 females, there were 100.8 males. For every 100 females age 18 and over, there were 97.8 males.

The median household income was $47,729 and the median family income  was $54,849. Males had a median income of $35,679 versus $30,736 for females. The per capita income for the city was $21,563. About 7.1% of families and 10.4% of the population were below the poverty line, including 12.5% of those under age 18 and 7.7% of those age 65 or over.

Economy

lynda.com, an online software training company ranked as one of the fastest-growing private companies in the U.S. (according to Inc. magazine's 2010 500|5000 company listing) had its headquarters in Carpinteria. The company was purchased by LinkedIn in 2015 for $1.5 billion. ProCore Technologies, a construction management software company, also has its headquarters in Carpinteria.

Since 1987, the California Avocado Festival has been held in Carpinteria on the first weekend of October.

The Santa Barbara Polo Club, one of the main equestrian polo fields in the country, is located just West of Carpinteria (outside of city limits).

The city is also home to Pete's Living, an organic produce company that was previously known as Hollandia Produce.

Top employers
According to the city's 2020 Comprehensive Annual Financial Report, the top employers in the city are:

Arts and culture
Carpinteria hosts an annual California Avocado Festival, with a history extending back to 1986. Over 80,000 persons attend the three-day festival which takes place during the first weekend of October. The festival offers avocado products and locally made goods. It also hosts the Carpinteria Arts Center.

Education
The city of Carpinteria is served by the Carpinteria Unified School District. It includes one high school, one middle (junior high) school, and four public elementary schools, one of which is an alternative school of choice (K-5). The district also has an alternative high school. Other schools include: Howard Carden School, a private pre-K-8 elementary school, Carpinteria Christian School, a Baptist K-8 school, Cate School, a private preparatory school and Pacifica Graduate Institute, home of the Joseph Campbell and Marija Gimbutas Library. This graduate school offers master's and PhD programs in depth psychology and mythology.

The Carpinteria Unified School District, which also includes the community of Summerland, and some outlying areas, includes the following:
 Carpinteria Middle (5351 Carpinteria Ave)
 Canalino Elementary (1480 Linden Ave)
 Aliso Elementary (4545 Carpinteria Ave)
 Carpinteria Family School (1480 Linden Ave)
 Summerland Elementary (135 Valencia Road)
 Carpinteria Senior High (4810 Foothill Rd)
 Rincon High (4698 Foothill Rd)
 Foothill Alternative High (4698 Foothill Rd)
Students at elementary schools prepared two web sites about Carpinteria for the year 2000 and 2001 International Schools CyberFair competitions.

Transportation

U.S. Route 101 passes through Carpinteria, connecting the city to major destinations such as Los Angeles as well as Santa Barbara and points further north such as San Francisco. State Route 150 passes through a portion of Carpinteria, providing connections to Ojai and Santa Paula. State Route 192 also has a short segment in Carpinteria, providing a westward connection to Santa Barbara.

The Carpinteria Amtrak Station is served by Amtrak's Pacific Surfliner from San Luis Obispo to San Diego.

Carpinteria MTD provides local bus service. VISTA provides commuter bus service to Ventura, Santa Barbara, and Los Angeles.

Notable people
 Ichak Adizes, business consultant 
 David Binney, alto saxophonist, composer, producer
 Maxwell Caulfield, actor
 Stan Cornyn, recording executive
 Kevin Costner, actor
 Warren Christopher, former US Secretary of State (1993–97)
 Ellen DeGeneres, comedian, talk show host
 Susan Flannery, actress
 Chris Gocong, football player
 Jesse James, actor
Mila Kunis, actor
Ashton Kutcher, actor
 Dennis Miller, comedian, talk show host
 Alan Thicke, actor, songwriter, game and talk show host
 Robert Zemeckis, film director

References

External links

 
Movies and television shows filmed in Carpinteria 

 
Cities in Santa Barbara County, California
Populated coastal places in California
Incorporated cities and towns in California
Populated places established in 1965
1965 establishments in California